Eucalyptus decipiens, commonly known as redheart or redheart moit is a species of mallee or small tree that is endemic to Western Australia. It has varying amounts of rough, imperfectly shed ribbons of brownish bark and smooth whitish to grey bark, lance-shaped adult leaves, flower buds in groups of between eleven and twenty one, and conical to flattened hemispherical fruit.

Description
It has varying amounts of rough, flaky, greyish brown ribbony bark and smooth grey to pinkish bark. Adult leaves are arranged alternately, thick, dull, grey-green and lance-shaped with a hook-like tip. Flowering occurs between August and January and the flowers are creamy white.

Taxonomy and naming
Eucalyptus decipiens was first formally described in 1837 by the botanist Stephan Endlicher from a specimen collected near King Georges Sound by Charles von Hügel. The description was published in the book Enumeratio plantarum quas in Novae Hollandiae ora austro-occidentali ad fluvium Cygnorum et in sinu Regis Georgii collegit Carolus Liber Baro de Hügel. The specific epithet (decipiens) is derived from the Latin word decipio meaning "to beguile" or "to cheat" but the reason Endlicher gave this name is not clear, but may refer to its similarity to another species.

Subspecies, including E. decipiens subsp. chalara Brooker & Hopper have been described but the names have not been accepted by the Australian Plant Census.

Distribution and habitat
Redheart is found on sandplains, hills and along the edges of swamps in the Wheatbelt, South West and Great Southern regions of Western Australia growing in clay, loam or sandy soils over laterite.

See also
List of Eucalyptus species

References

Eucalypts of Western Australia
decipiens
Myrtales of Australia
Plants described in 1837
Taxa named by Stephan Endlicher